Ethmia antranella is a moth in the family Depressariidae. It was described by Viette in 1976. It is found in Madagascar.

References

Moths described in 1976
antranella